Agonía de amor is a Mexican telenovela produced by Televisa for Telesistema Mexicano in 1963.

Cast 
Jacqueline Andere
 
Bertha Moss
Adriana Roel
Alma Martinez
Ada Carrasco
Miguel Macia
Jorge Mondragón
Luis Bayardo
Luz Márquez

References

External links 

Mexican telenovelas
1963 telenovelas
Televisa telenovelas
1963 Mexican television series debuts
1963 Mexican television series endings
Spanish-language telenovelas